home a/s is a Danish chain of real estate agencies, wholly owned by Danske Bank, the largest bank in Denmark. The chain was established on August 1, 1989, and as of 2005, it has approximately a quarter of the Danish real estate market.

From 1998 to 1999 the chain was co-sponsoring a professional road bicycle racing team, named Team home - Jack & Jones, together with the clothes brand Jack & Jones.

External links
Official website

Real estate companies of Denmark
Danske Bank
Danish companies established in 1989
Real estate companies established in 1989